The Tongxiao Shrine is a shrine in Tongxiao Township, Miaoli County, Taiwan.

History
The shrine was built in 1937 during the Japanese rule of Taiwan. After the handover of Taiwan from Japan to the Republic of China, the main hall of the shrine was renovated by Tongxiao Mayor into the Tongxiao Zhonglie Shrine in 1947 for people to honor the fallen Republic of China Armed Forces in World War II. The shrine was damaged by the Jiji earthquake in 1999. In 2002, the government designated the shrine as historical monument and restored it. The main shrine has eventually turned into Martyr's Shrine and honour Koxinga.

Transportation
The shrine is accessible within walking distance north east of Tongxiao Station of Taiwan Railways.

See also
 Gongtian Temple
 List of tourist attractions in Taiwan

References

1937 establishments in Taiwan
20th-century Shinto shrines
Buildings and structures in Miaoli County
Shinto shrines in Taiwan